Durgapur Purba Assembly constituency is an assembly constituency in Paschim Bardhaman district in the Indian state of West Bengal.

Overview
As per orders of the Delimitation Commission, No. 276 Durgapur Purba assembly constituency covers ward nos. 1 – 10, 23 – 28 of Durgapur municipal corporation and Amlajora, Gopalpur and Molandighi gram panchayats of Kanksa community development block.

As per orders of Delimitation Commission Durgapur Purba Assembly constituency is part of No. 39 Bardhaman-Durgapur (Lok Sabha constituency).

Members of Legislative Assembly

Election results

2021

2016

.# Swing calculated on Congress+Trinamool Congress vote percentages in 2011 taken together, as well as the CPI(M) vote for Durgapur Purba constituency.

2011

.# Swing calculated on Congress+Trinamool Congress vote percentages in 2006 taken together, as well as the CPI(M) vote for Durgapur II constituency.

1977-2006
In 2006 assembly elections, Biprendu Kumar Chakraborty of CPI (M) won the Durgapur II seat defeating his nearest rival Apurba Mukherjee of Trinamool Congress. Contests in most years were multi cornered but only winners and runners are being mentioned. Apurba Mukherjee won the seat in 2001 defeating Debabrata Banerjee  of CPI (M). In 1996, Debabrata Banerjee had won the seat defeating Malay Kanti Dutta of Congress. In 1991, Tarun Chatterjee of CPI (M) had won the seat defeating Asit Chattaraj of Congress. Tarun Chatterjee won it in 1987 defeating Narayan Hazara Chowdhury of Congress. In 1982, Tarun Chaterjee defeated Baren Roy of Congress. Tarun Chatterjee defeated Ajit Banerjee of Congress in 1977.

1962-1972
Ananda Gopal Mukherjee of Congress won the Durgapur seat in 1972.  Dilip Mazumdar of CPI (M) won the seat in 1971, 1969 and 1967. Ananda Gopal Mukherjee of INC won the seat in 1962.

References

Politics of Paschim Bardhaman district
Assembly constituencies of West Bengal
Durgapur, West Bengal